Eastern Orthodoxy in North America represents adherents, religious communities, institutions and organizations of Eastern Orthodox Christianity in North America, including the United States, Canada, Mexico and other North American states. Estimates of the number of Eastern Orthodox adherents in North America vary considerably depending on methodology (as well as the definition of the term "adherent") and generally fall in range from 3 million to 6 million. Most Eastern Orthodox Christians in North America are Russian Americans, Turkish Americans, Greek Americans, Arab Americans, Ukrainian Americans, Albanian Americans, Macedonian Americans, Romanian Americans, Bulgarian Americans and Serbian Americans, with Americans from other Eastern European countries and growing minorities of converted Americans of Western European, African, Latin American, and East Asian descent.

Statistically, Eastern Orthodox Christians are among the wealthiest Christian denominations in the United States, and they also tend to be better educated than most other religious groups in America. They have a high number of graduate (68%) and post-graduate degrees (28%) per capita.

Early Russian Orthodox presence in the Americas

Russian traders settled in Alaska during the 18th century. In 1740, a Divine Liturgy was celebrated on board a Russian ship off the Alaskan coast. In 1794, the Russian Orthodox Church sent missionaries—among them Saint Herman of Alaska – to establish a formal mission in Alaska. Their missionary endeavors contributed to the conversion of many Alaskan natives to the Orthodox faith. A diocese was established, whose first bishop was Saint Innocent of Alaska. The headquarters of this North American Diocese of the Russian Orthodox Church was moved from Alaska to California around the mid-19th century.

It was moved again in the last part of the same century, this time to New York. This transfer coincided with a great movement of Eastern Catholics to the Eastern Orthodox Church in the eastern United States. This movement, which increased the numbers of Eastern Orthodox Christians in America, resulted from a conflict between John Ireland, the politically powerful Roman Catholic Archbishop of Saint Paul, Minnesota; and Alexis Toth, an influential Ruthenian Catholic priest.  Archbishop Ireland's refusal to accept Fr. Toth's credentials as a priest induced Fr. Toth to join the Eastern Orthodox Church, and further resulted in the conversion of tens of thousands of other Uniate Catholics in North America to the Eastern Orthodox Church, under his guidance and inspiration.  For this reason, Ireland is sometimes ironically remembered as the "Father of the Orthodox Church in America." These Uniates were received into Eastern Orthodoxy into the existing North American diocese of the Russian Orthodox Church. At the same time large numbers of Greeks and other Eastern Orthodox Christians were also immigrating to America. At this time all Eastern Orthodox Christians in North America were united under the omophorion (Church authority and protection) of the Patriarch of Moscow, through the Russian Church's North American diocese. The unity was not merely theoretical, but was a reality, since there was then no other diocese on the continent. Under the aegis of this diocese, which at the turn of the 20th century was ruled by Bishop (and future Patriarch) Tikhon, Eastern Orthodox Christians of various ethnic backgrounds were ministered to, both non-Russian and Russian; a Syro-Arab mission was established in the episcopal leadership of Saint Raphael of Brooklyn, who was the first Eastern Orthodox bishop to be consecrated in America.

Orthodox Church in America (OCA)

One of the effects of the persecution and administrative chaos wreaked on the Russian Orthodox Church by the Bolshevik Revolution was a flood of refugees from Russia to the United States, Canada, and Europe.  The Revolution of 1917 severed large sections of the Russian church—dioceses in America, Japan, and Manchuria, as well as refugees in Europe—from regular contact with the mother church. 

In 1920 Patriarch Tikhon issued an ukase (decree) that dioceses of the Church of Russia that were cut off from the governance of the highest Church authority (i.e. the Patriarch) should continue independently until such time as normal relations with the highest Church authority could be resumed; and on this basis, the North American diocese of the Russian Orthodox Church (known as the "Metropolia") continued to exist in a de facto autonomous mode of self-governance. The financial hardship that beset the North American diocese as the result of the Russian Revolution resulted in a degree of administrative chaos, with the result that other national Orthodox communities in North America turned to the churches in their respective homelands for pastoral care and governance.

A group of bishops who had left their sees in Russia gathered in Sremski-Karlovci, Yugoslavia, and adopted a clearly political monarchist stand. The group further claimed to speak as a synod for the entire "free" Russian church. This group, which to this day includes a sizable portion of the Russian emigration, was formally dissolved in 1922 by Patriarch Tikhon, who then appointed metropolitans Platon and Evlogy as ruling bishops in America and Europe, respectively. Both of these metropolitans continued to entertain relations intermittently with the synod in Karlovci, but neither of them accepted it as a canonical authority. 
Between the World Wars the Metropolia coexisted and at times cooperated with an independent synod later known as Russian Orthodox Church Outside Russia (ROCOR), sometimes also called the Russian Orthodox Church Abroad. The two groups eventually went their separate ways. ROCOR, which moved its headquarters to North America after the Second World War, claimed but failed to establish jurisdiction over all parishes of Russian origin in North America. The Metropolia, as a former diocese of the Russian Church, looked to the latter as its highest church authority, albeit one from which it was temporarily cut off under the conditions of the communist regime in Russia.

After World War II the patriarchate of Moscow made unsuccessful attempts to regain control over these groups.  After resuming communication with Moscow in early 1960s, and being granted autocephaly in 1970, the Metropolia became known as the Orthodox Church in America. However, recognition of this autocephalic status is not universal, as the Ecumenical Patriarch (under whom is the Greek Orthodox Archdiocese of America) and some other jurisdictions have not officially accepted it. The reasons for this are complex; nevertheless the Ecumenical Patriarch and the other jurisdictions remain in communion with the OCA.  The patriarchate of Moscow thereby renounced its former canonical claims in the United States and Canada; it also acknowledged an autonomous church established in Japan that same year.

Other Eastern Orthodox churches

Today there are many Orthodox churches in the United States and Canada that are still bound to the Ecumenical or Antiochian patriarchates, or other overseas jurisdictions; in some cases these different overseas jurisdictions will have churches in the same U.S. city. However, there are also many "pan-orthodox" activities and organizations, both formal and informal, among Orthodox believers of all jurisdictions. One such organization is the Assembly of Canonical Orthodox Bishops of the United States of America (successor to SCOBA), which comprises North American Orthodox bishops from nearly all jurisdictions. (See list of Eastern Orthodox jurisdictions in North America.)

In June 2002, the Antiochian Orthodox Church granted self-rule to the Antiochian Orthodox Archdiocese of North America. Some observers see this as a step towards greater organizational unity in North America.

During the past 50 years there have come into existence in North America a number of Western Rite Orthodox parishes. These are sometimes labelled "Western Orthodox Churches" but this term is not generally used by Orthodox Christians of Eastern or Western rite. These are Orthodox Christians who use the Western forms of liturgy (Roman Rite) yet are Orthodox in their theology. The Antiochian Orthodox Church and ROCOR both have Western Rite parishes.

There are over 2,000 Orthodox parishes in the United States. Roughly two-thirds of these belong to the OCA, Greek and Antiochian jurisdictions, while the rest are divided among other jurisdictions.

Demographics

Churches belonging to the Assembly of Canonical Orthodox Bishops of the United States
This is a list of all canonical Eastern Orthodox churches in the United States. They all form the Assembly of Canonical Orthodox Bishops of the United States of America. These churches are in full communion with one another, and are all officially recognized by one another. The Orthodox Church in America is regarded as canonical and is in full communion with all the other groups, but its self-governance is questioned.

There may be as many as seven million people in the United States who self-identify as Orthodox due to ethnicity or being baptized as children. They may also be married in the church and baptize their children in the church, but they remain unknown to parishes and do not participate in church life. Many recent immigrants who have come to America also self-identify as Orthodox, but never participate in church life. The table below does not include either of these categories, limiting itself to those Orthodox believers who attend parish churches at least often enough to be counted in the official parish statistics. They are listed as "adherents." The "regular attendees" are the number of people who attend church on a typical Sunday.

The listing is according to canonical position in the order of the diptychs (the ceremonial rankings of jurisdictions within the Orthodox Church). For each North American branch (archdiocese or diocese), the table also lists the jurisdiction of which it is part. The Orthodox Church in America is a jurisdiction onto itself.

Groups whose canonical status is contested

This is a list of major churches within the United States which are not in communion with the Assembly of Canonical Orthodox Bishops of the United States of America, and are therefore not recognized as canonical by the worldwide Orthodox Church. However, these groups regard themselves as canonical, and may or may not recognize other churches as canonical.

Eastern Orthodoxy in Canada
Adherents of Eastern Orthodox Christianity in Canada traditionally belong to several ethnic communities and ecclesiastical jurisdictions (canonical and noncanonical). According to official 2011 census data, Greek Orthodox community constitutes the largest Eastern Orthodox community in Canada, with 220,255 adherents. It is followed by other communities: Russian Orthodox (25,245), Ukrainian Orthodox (23,845), Serbian Orthodox (22,780), Romanian Orthodox (7,090), Macedonian Orthodox (4,945), Bulgarian Orthodox (1,765), Antiochian Orthodox (1,220) and several other minor communities within the scope of Eastern Orthodoxy.

See also

References

Sources